Georgios Iordanidis (born 28 March 1989) is a Greek professional footballer who plays as a midfielder for Kozani.

Career
Born in Giannitsa, Iordanidis began playing football with local side Anagennisi Giannitsa.

External links
Profile at epae.org
Profile at myplayer.gr

1989 births
Living people
Greek footballers
Kozani F.C. players
Panetolikos F.C. players
Association football midfielders
Footballers from Giannitsa